Minicar or mini car may refer to:
Bond Minicar, a three-wheeler made by Bond Cars Ltd
City car, a European car classification
Kei car, a Japanese car classification
Mini, a popular British small car made from 1959 to 2000
Mini Hatch, a retro-styled supermini produced in 2001 by BMW
Mini 4WD, an AA-powered toy car that used to be popular in Asia

See also
 Car (disambiguation)
 Small car (disambiguation)
 Minivan, an American car classification
 Model car, including children's minicars
 Pedal car, including children's car-silhouette quadricycle minicars